Scottish Development Department may refer to:

 Scottish Development Department, part of the former Scottish Office, pre-1999
 Scottish Executive Development Department, 1999 to 2007